John Hubbard Tweedy (November 9, 1814 – November 12, 1891) was a delegate to the United States Congress from Wisconsin Territory from March 1847 to May 1848 being elected from the Whig Party. He was also the Whig Party nominee in first Wisconsin gubernatorial election, where he lost to Nelson Dewey.

Career
Tweedy was born in Danbury, Connecticut. He graduated from Yale University in 1834, where he was a member of the secret society Skull and Bones. He then moved to Milwaukee, Wisconsin Territory, in 1836, where he practiced law. He served in the Wisconsin Territorial Council, the upper house of the Wisconsin Territorial Legislature, in 1841–1842, and later served in the Wisconsin State Assembly in 1853. Tweedy was also a member of the first Wisconsin Constitutional Convention of 1846.

Tweedy was elected as a non-voting delegate to the Thirtieth Congress to represent the Wisconsin Territory, serving from March 4, 1847, until Wisconsin became a state on May 29, 1848. Tweedy was prominent in business involving railroads and public affairs. He died in Milwaukee, Wisconsin, aged 77, and was buried in Danbury, Connecticut.

Private papers
His son, John H. Tweedy, Jr., donated his papers to the Wisconsin Historical Society.

Notes

External links

|-

1814 births
1891 deaths
Delegates to the United States House of Representatives from Wisconsin Territory
Members of the Wisconsin Territorial Legislature
Members of the Wisconsin State Assembly
Politicians from Danbury, Connecticut
Lawyers from Milwaukee
Politicians from Milwaukee
Wisconsin Whigs
Yale College alumni
19th-century American politicians
19th-century American lawyers